Curubis is a genus of Asian jumping spiders native to India and Sri Lanka which was first described by Eugène Louis Simon in 1902.  it contains four species.

Species
 it contains four species, found only in India and Sri Lanka:
Curubis annulata Simon, 1902 – Sri Lanka
Curubis erratica Simon, 1902 (type) – India, Sri Lanka
Curubis sipeki Dobroruka, 2004 – India
Curubis tetrica Simon, 1902 – India, Sri Lanka

References

Salticidae
Salticidae genera
Spiders of Asia
Taxa named by Eug%C3%A8ne Simon